Doctor's Lake East Water Aerodrome  is located on Doctor's Lake, northwest of Nova Scotia Trunk 1 and north-northeast of Lake Milo in Yarmouth County, Nova Scotia, Canada.

See also
Doctor's Lake West Water Aerodrome
Yarmouth Airport
Yarmouth (Regional Hospital) Heliport

References

Registered aerodromes in Nova Scotia
Seaplane bases in Nova Scotia